The Samuel Gardner House is a historic colonial American house in Swansea, Massachusetts.  This -story wood frame gambrel-roofed house was built c. 1768 by Samuel Gardner, whose father (also named Samuel) was the first English colonist to settle Gardner's Neck after its purchase from local Native Americans.  It is a well-preserved 18th century farmhouse.

The house was listed on the National Register of Historic Places in 1990.

See also
National Register of Historic Places listings in Bristol County, Massachusetts

References

Houses in Bristol County, Massachusetts
Swansea, Massachusetts
Houses on the National Register of Historic Places in Bristol County, Massachusetts